Cada may refer to:

People
 David Čada (born 1986), Czech football player
 Joe Cada (born 1987), American poker player
 Josef Čada (1881–1959), Czech gymnast
 Petra Cada (born 1979), Canadian table tennis player

Places
 Azohouè-Cada, Benin
 Tori-Cada, Benin

Other
 CADA, Argentine Athletics Confederation
 Cada is Spanish for every and each. 
 CADA, Australian radio station